Kolonnawa Urban Council is the local authority for Kolonnawa and surrounding suburbs in Sri Lanka. It has 20 members elected under the mixed electoral system where 60% of members are elected using first-past-the-post voting and the remaining 40% through closed list proportional representation.

History 

Originally created in 1930, the Kolonnawa  Urban  Council came into being as a hub for warehousing and service sector for the nearby Port of Colombo. Traders and retailers working in the various city markets, as well as low-income workers engaged in shipping-related activities were the mainstay of the Kolonnawa populace. In addition to residential areas, a large volume of industrial and commercial buildings such as stores, warehouses, container yards, electricity distribution infrastructure (including the Kelanitissa Power Station) and the Ceylon Petroleum Storage Terminal (Kolonnawa Refinery) are located in the Kolonnawa area.

Geography 

Mostly lying in the flood plain of the Kelani River, 70% of the land lies below Sea level. A Flood control dam constructed in 1935 (named the Harward Bund) protects the area south of it from flooding of the river.

The Council is bounded to the West by the Colombo Municipal Council, to the South by Sri Jayawardenapura Kotte Municipal Council, and to the East by the Mulleriyawa Pradeshiya Sabha.

Wards 

For electoral and administrative purposes, the Council is divided into 9 wards:

 Sedawatta
 Wadulla
 Orugodawatta
 Wellampitiya
 Dahampura
 Kolonnawa
 Singhapura
 Salamulla
 Gajabapura

Demographics

Kolonnawa Urban Council is a multi-religious, multi-ethnic, multi-cultural area. The population fell from 57,984 in 1981 to 55,285 in 2001.

References

External links 
 Urban Development Authority - Kolonnawa Zoning Plan
 Ward Map of Kolonnawa Urban Council - Colombo District

Local authorities in Western Province, Sri Lanka
Urban councils of Sri Lanka